Lars Thomas Öberg (born 10 August 1958 in Malmberget) is a Swedish former competitive figure skater. He is a four-time Nordic champion (1973, 1976, 1978–79) and a nine-time Swedish national champion (1972–80). He represented his country at the 1980 Winter Olympics in Lake Placid, New York, and placed 14th. A competitor at multiple World and European Championships, he finished in the top ten at the 1980 Europeans in Gothenburg.

Results

References

1958 births
Living people
People from Gällivare Municipality
Swedish male single skaters
Olympic figure skaters of Sweden
Figure skaters at the 1980 Winter Olympics
Sportspeople from Norrbotten County